Nathan Kipner (October 2, 1924 – December 1, 2009) was an American songwriter and record producer with a considerable career in Australia. He is remembered as the producer of the Bee Gees' first hit "Spicks and Specks". He was the father of Steve Kipner who is also a songwriter and music producer.

History
Kipner was born in Dayton, Ohio.

He joined the US Army Air Corps and served with Supply, 4ADG (4th Air Depot Group) which became 81st Air Depot Group, arriving in Brisbane, Australia aboard SS President Coolidge on December 26, 1941, later serving in Finschhafen, Papua New Guinea.

Kipner married Alma Dorothy Moore of Albion, Queensland at Holy Trinity, Brisbane on November 4, 1944; they lived in America until the early 1950s, when they returned to Brisbane with their young son Steve.
There he found work with the newly established home appliance department of Queensland Home Furnishers, Queen Street, Petrie Bight.

After hosting a live to air pop music programme on Brisbane TV, he joined entrepreneur Ivan Dayman's "Sunshine" artist and venue management company, and moved to Sydney, where he produced hit records "Shakin' All Over" and "Que Sera, Sera" for Normie Rowe and "Velvet Waters" for Tony Worsley on Sunshine Records.

In 1965 he became A&R manager for Clyde Packer, helping him found the record label "Spin", signing up the Bee Gees, whose career with the Festival label had gone nowhere, and produced their first hit "Spicks and Specks".

Kipner returned to America, and died at West Hills, California aged 86, survived by his wife Alma and son Steve.

Songwriting credits
Kipner wrote or co-wrote (principally the lyrics to) a great number of popular songs, among them:
"Cheryl Moana Marie" (w/ John Rowles); recorded by John Rowles
"Got a Zac in the Back of Me Pocket"; Johnny Devlin
"How Can I Make It on My Own"; Co-Co
"I Found a New Love"; Lonnie Lee
"Keep Singing Those Love Songs"; Co-Co
"Too Much, Too Little, Too Late"; Johnny Mathis and Deniece Williams

References 

1924 births
2009 deaths
Australian record producers
Australian songwriters
United States Army Air Forces personnel of World War II